Xavier Willison (born 2 August 2002) is a Cook Islands international rugby league footballer who plays as a  forward for the Brisbane Broncos in the NRL.

Playing career

2021
In round 20 of the 2021 NRL season, Willison made his debut for the Brisbane club against fierce rivals the North Queensland Cowboys.

On 17 August, it was announced that Willison would be ruled out indefinitely with an ACL injury.

References

External links
Brisbane Broncos profile

2002 births
Living people
Brisbane Broncos players
Cook Islands national rugby league team players
New Zealand sportspeople of Cook Island descent
New Zealand Māori rugby league players
Norths Devils players
Rugby league players from Hamilton, New Zealand
Rugby league props
Rugby league second-rows